Nora Maria Attal is a British fashion model of Moroccan heritage. She has been on the cover of the September issue of British Vogue, Vogue Arabia, and Vogue. In January 2019 Attal ranked as top 50 models, and in 2022 listed as an Icon by models.com.

Career
Attal was discovered by photographer Jamie Hawkesworth at her school, who was casting for a JW Anderson ad. She has modelled for Prada, Elie Saab, Acne Studios, Burberry, Loewe, Oscar de la Renta, Jason Wu, Stella McCartney, Nina Ricci, Chloé, Altuzarra, Céline, H&M, Prabal Gurung, Longchamp, Tommy Hilfiger, Mary Katrantzou, Topshop, Hermès, Roberto Cavalli, Michael Kors, Sonia Rykiel, Fendi, Chanel, Valentino, Dior, Versace, and Alexander McQueen.

In 2016, models.com chose her as a “Top Newcomer”.

References

Living people
English people of Moroccan descent
British female models
Moroccan female models
1999 births